The bush squeaker (Arthroleptis wahlbergii) is a species of frog in the family Arthroleptidae. It is found along the coastal areas of eastern South Africa and possibly Mozambique.

Habitat

Its natural habitats are subtropical or tropical dry forests, subtropical or tropical moist shrubland, plantations, rural gardens, urban areas, and heavily degraded former forest, where it is found mostly in leaf-litter and rotting vegetation.

Biology and habits

The eggs are laid in damp leaf-litter where the young hatch as miniature frogs. The call is a high-pitched squeak, usually emitted during wet weather, which is often mistaken for the calls of crickets.

It is threatened by habitat loss.

References

 Sasol Field Guide to Frogs of Southern Africa, V. Carruthers, 2001 - .

Arthroleptis
Amphibians of South Africa
Taxonomy articles created by Polbot
Amphibians described in 1849